The Kinfolk Motorcycle Club are an American one-percenter outlaw motorcycle club best known for their longstanding rivalry with the Bandidos Motorcycle Club. The club was formed in Texas and has around several chapters within the United States and chapters in Europe, Australia, Asia, and South America.

History
Kinfolk MC was founded in 2016 by several bikers who had left the Bandidos MC due to disapproval in its leadership, calling it a "dictatorship". The remaining members of the Bandidos did not take kindly to their ex-members' departure and establishment of a new club, which has been the cause of much conflict between both groups.

Criminal allegations and incidents
On March 4, 2016 Kinfolk MC member Dusty Childress was gunned down in Jones County, Texas by Wesley Dale Mason, a member of the rival Bandidos MC. He was sentenced to life in prison for the murder.

On July 30, 2017, Kinfolk MC member Javier Gonzalez was sentenced on a murder charge in the shooting of Juan "Compa" Martinez Jr, a Bandido MC member in El Paso, Texas. Martinez, who was shot seven times, died days after the shooting. Three other men linked to the Bandidos were injured in the shooting.

References 

Outlaw motorcycle clubs
Gangs in Texas
Gangs in New Mexico
Gangs in Louisiana
Gangs in Colorado
Gangs in the United States